The KSR Bengaluru City Junction–Kannur Express is an Express train belonging to South Western Railway zone that runs between  and  in India. It is currently being operated with 16511/16512 train numbers on a daily basis.

Service

The 16511/KSR Bengaluru City–Kannur Express has an average speed of 38 km/hr and covers 501 km in 13h 5m. The 16512/Kannur–KSR Bengaluru Express has an average speed of 36 km/hr and covers 501 km in 13h 45m.

Route and halts 

The important halts of the train are:

 
 Kunigal
 Shravanabelagola
 
 
 
 
 Bantwal(BC Road)
 
 
 
 Kanhangad
 Nileshwar
 Payyanur

Coach composition

The train has standard ICF rakes with a max speed of 110 kmph. The train consists of 18 coaches:

 1 AC II Tier
 2 AC III Tier
 9 Sleeper coaches
 4 General Unreserved
 2 Seating cum Luggage Rake

Traction

Both trains are hauled by a Krishnarajapuram Loco Shed-based WDP-4D diesel locomotive between Bangalore and Mangalore Central and Erode/Arakkonam Loco Shed based WAP-4 based electric locomotive between Mangalore Central and Kannur .

Direction reversal

The train reverses its direction 1 times:

 Mangaluru Central

See also 

 Bangalore City railway station
 Kannur railway station
 Yesvantpur–Kannur Express

Notes

References

External links 

 16517/KSR Bengaluru City–Kannur Express India Rail Info
 16518/Kannur–KSR Bengaluru City Express India Rail Info

Transport in Kannur
Transport in Bangalore
Express trains in India
Rail transport in Kerala
Rail transport in Karnataka
Railway services introduced in 2007